Herbert E. Clark is an American politician from Maine. A Democrat from Millinocket, Clark served 12 terms in the Maine House of Representatives. He was first elected in 1980 and was subsequently re-elected every two years until 1996. Clark ran again for the House in 2004. He was re-elected again until 2012, when he was unable to seek re-election due to term-limits. He ran in 2012 against incumbent Republican State Senator Doug Thomas for District 27. Clark (8,061 votes) lost to Thomas (9,481 votes). Two years later in 2014, Clark again ran for State Senate. He lost in the primary to Representative Jim Dill.

Clark attended Eastern Maine Technical College, Kennebec Technical College and University of Maine.

References

Year of birth missing (living people)
Living people
People from Millinocket, Maine
Democratic Party members of the Maine House of Representatives
University of Maine alumni